Love and Lemons is a 2013 Swedish romantic comedy film directed by Teresa Fabik, based on the novel Yesterday's News by Kajsa Ingemarsson.

Cast
 Rakel Wärmländer as Agnes
 Dan Ekborg as Gerard
 Josephine Bornebusch as Lussan
 Sverrir Gudnason as David Kummel
 Tomas von Brömssen as pappa Sven
 Anki Lidén as mamma Maud
 Eric Ericson as Kalle
 Richard Ulfsäter as Tobias

References

External links
 
 

2013 romantic comedy films
2013 films
Films based on Swedish novels
Films shot in Gothenburg
Films shot in Stockholm
Films shot in Trollhättan
Swedish romantic comedy films
2010s Swedish-language films
Tre Vänner films
2010s Swedish films